Victor Scvortov (born 30 March 1988) is a Moldovan-born Emirati judoka. He originally represented his birth nation in international events, but he moved to the United Arab Emirates along with two other Moldovan judoka in 2013. He competed at the 2016 Summer Olympics in the men's 73 kg event, in which he was eliminated in the third round by Shohei Ono.

He also competed in the men's 73 kg event at the 2020 Summer Olympics in Tokyo, Japan.

References

External links
 
 

1988 births
Living people
Moldovan male judoka
Emirati male judoka
Olympic judoka of the United Arab Emirates
Judoka at the 2016 Summer Olympics
Judoka at the 2020 Summer Olympics
Judoka at the 2018 Asian Games
Asian Games bronze medalists for the United Arab Emirates
Asian Games medalists in judo
Medalists at the 2018 Asian Games
Emirati people of Moldovan descent